After the end of World War II Germany was separated into nation-states. Each nation-state was governed by a different country because officials could not agree on peace terms. The Soviet Union had claimed the eastern portion of the country. In 1947, the "German People's Congress for Unity and Just Peace" met in Berlin. The Congress was to take the demands of all the occupied zones, and create a peace treaty which would enact a centralized German government. In order to have their nation-state properly represented, the Soviets created the German Democratic Republic in 1949 when they officially approved their constitution in May.

Purpose 
The purpose of propaganda in the German Democratic Republic was to maintain the Soviet ideology of socialism. Through various forms of propaganda, such as posters, pamphlets and speeches, the Soviet Union censored the ideas of the allied forces and the outside world from the citizens of Eastern Germany. News published in the GDR was intended to inform the East German public of how current events fitted into "the overall pattern of historical necessity", with news editors specifically instructed by the government to extract "from every item of news its possible relevance to the global struggle between capitalism and communism".

The GDR's propaganda also sought to portray the United States of America and other countries of the West, and especially its neighbour and main rival West Germany, in a negative light. For example, in 1950, the GDR published claims that the United States was sabotaging potato crops in East Germany by airdropping Colorado potato beetles onto crops. However, it has been claimed that the GDR's state newspaper, Neues Deutschland, failed to reach much of the East German population.

Media 
Media for East German propaganda during the Cold War played a very significant role in the persuasion and ideologies of the East German people at this time. The types of media that were most prevalent in their propaganda efforts were posters, pamphlets, tabloids, and speeches.

Posters 
Posters during the Cold War focused primarily on depictions of Stalin and his positive effects on East Germany. The information on the posters was used to convince the German people that the institutions of the Soviet Union would perpetuate a peaceful socialist society. Many other posters were used to depict the allied forces in a negative light, this form of propaganda was generated to make the Germans dislike the ally outsiders.

Pamphlets 
The German Democratic Republic created pamphlets to promote a socialist and peaceful way of life to those living in Eastern Germany. These pamphlets were dropped in the Federal Territory of East German zones in large "propaganda rockets" and small "metal coconuts", along with "occurrence reports" that documents the times they were sent and 'outside occurrences' to spread their news in an innovative, creative and far reaching way. The "propaganda rockets" allowed for more people to be exposed the information over a large geographic scale.

Tabloids 
The German tabloids during the cold war were used as media source to entertain and inform the working class with pictures, articles and news that highlighted the successes of the East German society.

Speeches 
There were many influential leaders and intellectuals during the Cold War in East Germany. Speeches were made in order to persuade the people to fall in line with the socialist movement and the leaders of the Soviet Union. These speeches, along with the propaganda aforementioned helped to convince the German people that socialism and the German Democratic Republic would remain intact.

Of central importance in the context of East German propaganda were the speeches given at the national memorial sites (Nationale Mahn- und Gedenkstätten) Buchenwald, Ravensbrück and Sachsenhausen on the occasion of the major anniversaries of the liberation of the concentration camps. According to historian Anne-Kathleen Tillack-Graf, the speeches were more about the current issues of the GDR concerning the political and economic situation, and only to a lesser extent about the lives and commemoration of the victims of the concentration camps and the historical events. Accordingly, the main topics of the speakers concerned Cold War issues such as peaceful coexistence, the arms race between the Soviet Union and the USA or Ronald Reagan's Star Wars. In addition, there was a somewhat distorted portrayal of historical events in favour of a positive presentation of socialism.

References

External links 
 History Channel Online, Cold War
 The GDR: A State of Peace and Socialism by Erich Honecker
 Map of Cold War Berlin, Encyclopædia Britannica Online
 Contra Magazine Tabloids
 The Birth of the German Democratic Republic
 Bye Germany, Hello Wall
 Picture link
 DDR Poster Exhibition Series

Cold War propaganda
Propaganda in Germany